Malitel is a mobile telephone service provider in Mali.  It is a subsidiary of Sotelma, the national telecommunications company.  Malitel's service is supported by Siemens AG.

External links
  Malitel

Telecommunications companies of Mali
12